The Time of the Dark is a novel by Barbara Hambly published in 1982. First part of The Darwath Trilogy.

Plot summary
The Time of the Dark is the first of a three part series of novels set in Darwath, a mystical realm located near to ours across the Void. In this novel, the wizard Ingold Inglorion recruits two people from our world - Rudy Solis and Gil Patterson - to help him in his battles against the Dark, a powerful race bent on destroying or enslaving all of mankind.

Chapter Outline
Chapter one: Gil meets Ingold, who has crossed the Void to find a place to stay while crossing worlds with the Prince.

Chapter two: Rudy's car breaks down and he finds the shack, then Ingold, then Gil.

Chapter three: Gil starts to drive Rudy back, but realizes that they've been sent away to keep them safe. The Dark attacks the shack.

Chapter four: They flee to Darwath, and find a nation in tatters in Karst.

Chapter five: Gil travels with Ingold to Gae to recover food from the ruined city. Ingold is stopped from descending the stairs of the Dark too far. Ingold is arrested.

Chapter six: Rudy wanders through Karst and finds Tir - and the Queen. The Dark come to Karst.

Chapter seven: Chaos in Karst as the Dark attacks. Rudy and Alde race to save Tir. Ingold is broken out of jail in time to save all.

Chapter eight: Rudy discovers that Alde is the Queen. Gil and Rudy cannot go home. Ingold describes the Nest of the Dark. Gil is offered a job.

Chapter nine: Rudy visits the Queen.

Chapter ten: The people of Gae start the long journey to the Keep

Chapter eleven: Minalde vists Rudy on the road. The Dark takes Medda. In desperation, Rudy calls forth fire. Ingold begins the long path of teaching Rudy Wizardry. Minalde and Rudy become lovers.

Chapter twelve: Minalde visits Rudy as he stands guard. Gil and Ingold feel a wrongness in the air and seek out its source. The long destroyed city of the Dark reveals itself.

Chapter thirteen: Gil and Ingold reach the Keep of Dare ahead of the convoy. The convoy is trapped by a collapsed bridge.

Chapter fourteen: Minalde breaks the deadlock. The convoy makes a last push to the keep through a snowstorm.

Chapter fifteen: The people of Gae make it to the Keep of Dare. Ingold reveals that the Dark want him above all else. Gil and Rudy discover that they have found their home.

Reception
Dave Langford reviewed The Time of the Dark for White Dwarf #67, and stated that "Cleverly anti-romantic touches make this a lot more appealing than you might expect from the cover or the chill news that it's volume 1 of a trilogy. Above average, I suppose."

Reviews
Review by Roger C. Schlobin (1982) in Fantasy Newsletter, #50 August 1982
Review by Baird Searles (1982) in Isaac Asimov's Science Fiction Magazine, November 1982

References

1982 novels